HDFC Bank Limited (also known as HDB) is an Indian banking and financial services company headquartered in Mumbai. It is India's largest private sector bank by assets and world's 10th largest bank by market capitalisation . It is the third largest company by market capitalisation of $127.16 billion on the Indian stock exchanges. It is also the fifteenth largest employer in India with nearly 150,000 employees.

History 
HDFC Bank was incorporated in 1994 as a subsidiary of the Housing Development Finance Corporation, with its registered office in Mumbai, Maharashtra, India. Its first corporate office and a full-service branch at Sandoz House, Worli were inaugurated by the then Union Finance Minister, Manmohan Singh.

, the bank's distribution network was at 6,378 branches across 3,203 cities. It has installed 430,000 POS terminals and issued 23,570,000 debit cards and 12 million credit cards in FY 2017. It has a base of 1,52,511 permanent employees as of 30 June 2022.

Products and services 
HDFC Bank provides a number of products and services including wholesale banking, retail banking, treasury, auto loans, two-wheeler loans, personal loans, loans against property, consumer durable loan, lifestyle loan and credit cards. Along with this various digital products are Payzapp and SmartBUY.

Mergers and acquisitions
HDFC Bank merged with Times Bank in February 2000. This was the first merger of two private banks in the New Generation private sector banks category. Times Bank was established by Bennett, Coleman and Co. Ltd., commonly known as The Times Group, India's largest media conglomerate.

In 2008, Centurion Bank of Punjab (CBoP) was acquired by HDFC Bank. HDFC Bank's board approved the acquisition of CBoP for ₹95.1 billion in one of the largest mergers in the financial sector in India.

In 2021, the bank acquired a 9.99% stake in FERBINE, an entity promoted by Tata Group, to operate a Pan-India umbrella entity for retail payment systems, similar to National Payments Corporation of India.

In September 2021, the bank partnered with Paytm to launch a range of credit cards powered by the global card network Visa.

On April 4, 2022, HDFC Bank announced merger with HDFC Limited.

Investments 

In March 2020, Housing Development Finance Corporation, parent company of HDFC Bank, made an investment of ₹1,000 crores in Yes Bank. As per the scheme of reconstruction of Yes Bank, 75% of the total investment by the corporation would be locked in for three years. On 14 March, Yes Bank allotted 100 crore shares of the face value of ₹2 each for consideration of ₹10 per share (including ₹8 premium) to the Corporation aggregating to 7.97 percent of the post issue equity share capital of Yes bank.

Listings and shareholding

The equity shares of HDFC Bank are listed on the Bombay Stock Exchange and the National Stock Exchange of India. Its American depositary receipts are listed on the NYSE  issued through JP Morgan Chase Bank.

Its global depository receipts (GDRs) was listed on the Luxembourg Stock Exchange but was terminated by board of directors following its low trading volume.

Corporate social responsibility - Parivartan 

Parivartan is an umbrella term for all of the corporate social responsibility initiatives by HDFC Bank.

HDFC Bank's Parivartan initiative spent ₹535 crore in FY 2019–20.

HDFC Bank spent Rs 634.91 crore towards Parivartan,in FY 2020-21. Out of Rs 634.9 crore, over Rs 110 crore was allocated and utilised towards initiatives focused on COVID-19 relief.

HDFC Bank pledges to become carbon neutral by 2032

Controversies 

On 2 December 2020, the Reserve Bank of India (RBI) ordered HDFC Bank to temporarily halt the issuance of new credit cards and all planned activities under the bank's Digital 2.0 program citing incidents of outages in the bank's internet banking, mobile banking and payment utility services.

On 29 January 2020, RBI imposed a monetary penalty on HDFC Bank for failure to undertake on-going due diligence in case of 39 current accounts opened for bidding in the initial public offer.

A HDFC bank manager was arrested on charges of fraud, involving a sum of ₹59.41 lakh, in Odisha.

Altico Capital and Dubai's Mashreq Bank have approached RBI, accusing HDFC Bank of violating regulatory provisions by debiting part of the funds the company had raised through external commercial borrowing (ECB) and parked at the bank. They claimed that HDFC bank's decision to transfer money from the account may be a violation of the RBI's end-use rule.

On 27 May 2021, RBI imposed a penalty of Rs 10 crore on HDFC Bank for deficiencies in regulatory compliances with regard to its auto loan portfolio.The said penalty was imposed in regards to the contraventions of certain provisions of the Banking Regulation Act, 1949.

Awards and recognition

2016 
Best Banking Performer, India in 2016 by Global Brands Magazine Award.
Best Performing Branch in Microfinance among private sector banks by NABARD, 2016, Award for Best Performance in Microfinance
KPMG study of India's Best Banks, Bank of the year & best digital banking initiative award 2016
BrandZ Rankings, Most Valued brand in India for third successive year
FinanceAsia poll on Asia's Best Companies 2015, Best managed public company – India
J. P. Morgan Quality Recognition Award, Best in class straight through processing rates

2018 
Company of the year: The Economic Times Corporate Excellence Awards
Best Performing Private Bank in Total Aadhaar Generation & Update: Aadhaar Excellence Awards
NPCI - National Payments Excellence Awards

2019 
Best Bank: New Private Sector – FE Best Bank awards
Winner in Innovation and Inclusiveness in Priority Sector Lending – 11th Inclusive Finance India Awards (IFI) 2019
Ranked 1st in 2019 BrandZ Top 75 Most Valuable Indian Brands HDFC Bank was featured for the 6th consecutive year.
Among The Most Honored Company List, Institutional Investor All-Asia (ex-Japan) Executive Team 2019 survey
India’s Best Bank, Euromoney Awards for Excellence 2019
Bank of the Year and Best Large Bank, Business Today – Money Today Financial Awards 2019
Best Bank in India 2019, by Global magazine FinanceAsia.
Ranked 60th in 2019 BrandZ Top 100 Most Valuable Global Brands HDFC Bank was featured BrandZ Top 100 Most Valuable Global Brands 2019 for the 5th consecutive year. The Bank's brand value has gone up from $20.87 billion in 2018 to $22.70 billion in 2019.
Best Large Bank & Fastest Growing Large Bank in 2019, by Business World Magna Awards
India's leading private sector bank: Dun & Bradstreet BFSI Awards

2020 
Best Bank in India: Euromoney Awards
Best Bank in India: FinanceAsia Country Awards

2021 

Best bank in india: FinanceAsia Country Awards
Best bank for SMEs: Asiamoney best bank awards
Best bank in india:The Euromoney Awards for Excellence
Ranks No. 1 in Mass Affluent category:Euromoney Private Banking and Wealth Management Survey
On 12 January 2022 HDFC BANK has been adjudged ' Best Private Bank in India' at the Global Private Banking Awards 2021, Organised by Professional Wealth Management (PWM)

2022 

Best Bank In India: Euromoney Awards for Excellence 2022

See also

 HDFC Life
 Aditya Puri
 Banking in India
 List of banks in India
 List of companies of India

References

Further reading

External links

Companies listed on the New York Stock Exchange
BSE SENSEX
NIFTY 50
Financial services companies based in Mumbai
Banks established in 1994
Indian brands
HDFC Group
Private sector banks in India
1994 establishments in Maharashtra
Banks based in Mumbai
Companies listed on the National Stock Exchange of India
Companies listed on the Bombay Stock Exchange